Diwakar Bhatt is an Indian politician from Uttarakhand and he is currently serving as Central President of regional party Uttarakhand Kranti Dal aka UKD. Bhatt was a member of the Uttarakhand Legislative Assembly from the Devprayag constituency in Tehri Garhwal district. He is one of the founding members of UKD.

References 
}

People from Tehri Garhwal district
Uttarakhand Kranti Dal politicians
Living people
21st-century Indian politicians
Year of birth missing (living people)